232 (two hundred [and] thirty-two) is the natural number following 231 and preceding 233.

In mathematics 

232 is both a central polygonal number and a cake number.
It is both a decagonal number and a centered 11-gonal number. It is also
a refactorable number,
a Motzkin sum,
an idoneal number, a Riordan number and a noncototient.

232 is a telephone number: in a system of seven telephone users, there are 232 different ways of pairing up some of the users.
There are also exactly 232 different eight-vertex connected indifference graphs, and 232 bracelets with eight beads of one color and seven of another. Because this number has the form , it follows that there are exactly 232 different functions from a set of four elements to a proper subset of the same set.

References

Integers